Stoob is a town in the district of Oberpullendorf in the Austrian state of Burgenland. It is approximately 15 km from the Hungarian border.  Stoob is notable for its pottery and ceramics college.

Population

References

Cities and towns in Oberpullendorf District